This is a list of Chile national football team's competitive records. The Chile national football team represents Chile in men's international football competitions and is controlled by the Federación de Fútbol de Chile which was established in 1895.

Individual records

Player records 

Players in bold are still active, at least at club level.

Most capped players

Top goalscorers

Manager records

Competition records

FIFA World Cup

 Champions   Runners-up   Third place   Fourth place

Copa América

FIFA Confederations Cup

Olympic Games

Pan American Games

Head-to-head record
This is a list of the official games played by Chile national football team. Although the team has played a number of countries around the world, some repeatedly, it has played the most games (90) against neighbouring Argentina.

This list is updated to include the match against Bolivia on 1 February 2022.

AFC

CAF

CONCACAF

CONMEBOL

OFC

UEFA

Full Confederation record

References

 
National association football team records and statistics